The , also called the  is a book of yōkai illustrated by Japanese artist Takehara Shunsensai, published about 1841. The book was intended as a followup to Toriyama Sekien's Gazu Hyakki Yagyō series. Like those books, it is a supernatural bestiary of ghosts, monsters, and spirits which has had a profound influence on subsequent yōkai imagery in Japan.

According to the Kokusho Sōmokuroku (Iwanami Shoten) this is considered to be a gesaku author from the latter half of the Edo period, .

It can be said that this is a kind of hundred-tale kaidan (ghost story) book popular in the Edo period, as "100 Tales" is part of the title, but rather than being tales with story titles, yōkai names are printed with illustrations of yōkai, so it could be said that this work is a fusion of kaidan book and picture book.

This book is also known by the title Tōsanjin Yawa because the title on the first page of each volume is "Tōsanjin Yawa, Volume [#]." Scholar of Japanese manners and customs  Ema Tsutomu (Nihon Yōkai Henka-shi, 1923) and folklorist Fujisawa Morihiko (Hentai Densetsu-shi, 1926), as well as magazines at that time, introduced this book by the name Tōsanjin Yawa, and so this title became famous. On the other hand, Mizuki Shigeru, in his 1979 Yōkai 100 Monogatari describes it in his references as "''Ehon Hyaku Monogatari (Author: Tōsanjin, Year of publication: Unknown)."

Ehon  Ehon have a 1,230 year long tradition in Japan. Beginning with the first ehon, a short prayer book, being published in the eighth century as a votive offering. The name ehon translates from Japanese as picture book. The main focus of these books were pictures or more specifically hand drawn paintings or wood-block printings (of which were popularized during the Edo period between 1603 and 1868) depending on the contents of the book itself and the reasons as to why it was printed. Often there would be such texts as essays, short stories, poems etc. that would accompany these pictures, although they would not necessarily be related to the illustrations. Most books in Japan would have been a collaboration between several people, all contributing to a different aspect of the book: the author to write the story, an artist to paint or cut and print the wood-blocks, paper makers, and book binders.

Toriyama Sekien   Born 1712 as Sano Toyofusa, Toriyama Sekien being a pen name he would commonly use. His family were of a hereditary class of the Shogun’s high-ranking servants known as obozu. With this position his family was able to afford to give him a high-level education under master artists Kano Gyokuen and Kano Chikanobu, both members of the state-sanctioned Kano School of art. Throughout his life he was accredited with over a dozen books, either as an author or contributing artist. Despite this proliferation of writing, his best known works are his Compendiums of Yokai. According to Hiroko Yoda and Matt Alt, authors/translators of “Japandemonium” (2013), Toriyama Sekien’s four works, Gazu Hyakki Yagyo (1776), Konjaku Gazu Zoku Hyakki (1779), Konjaku Hyakki Shui (1781), Hyakki Tsurezure Bukuro (1784), represent the, “...first mass produced illustrated compendiums of these wonderfully weird creatures.”

Yokai   Yokai can be at first thought of as monsters from Japanese folklore and legend. These are the things that are being depicted by both Takehara Shunsensai with his Ehon Hyaku Monogatari and in the original work by Toriyama Sekien with their illustrations and codified through the small text accompanying each picture. According to Michael Dylan Foster in his article, “Yokai: Fantastic Creatures of Japanese Folklore” (2022) Yokai once were invoked to try and explain any unknown phenomena, “such as eerie sounds in the night or fireballs flitting around a graveyard.”  In more recent times you can find Yokai depicted in the modern media of Japanese folklore, anime and manga. According to Deborah Shamoon in her article, “The Yokai in the Database: Supernatural Creatures and Folklore in Manga and Anime” (2013), Sekien’s original text Gazu Hyakki Yagyo and Takehara Shunsensai’s Ehon Hyaku Monogatari that followed, allowed for a codification of what had originally been a vague set of beliefs and would be one of the major contributing factors for the continuity of stories with still familiar Yokai that we enjoy today.

List of creatures 
The illustrations below are numbered by volume and appearance order. For example, the third illustration in the first volume is 1–3, and so on.

First volume 

 1-1 

 1–2 
 1–3 
 1–4 
 1–5 

 1–6 

 1–7 
 1–8 
 1–9

Second volume 

 2-1 
 2-2 
 2–3 
 2–4 

 2–5 

 2–6 
 2–7 
 2–8 

 2–9

Third volume 

 3-1 

 3-2 

 3-3 

 3–4 

 3–5 
 3–6 
 3–7 

 3–8

Fourth volume 

 4-1 
 4-2 

 4-3 
 4-4 

 4–5 

 4–6 

 4–7 

 4–8 

 4–9

Fifth volume 

 5-1 

 5-2 
 5-3 
 5-4 

 5-5 

 5–6 
 5–7 

 5–8 
 5–9

References

Ehon Hyaku Monogatari books
Foster, Michael Dylan, “Yokai: Fantastic Creatures of Japanese Folklore”, Japan Society (2022). https://aboutjapan.japansociety.org/yokai-fantastic-creatures-of-japanese-folklore
Fujisawa Moriko, “Hentai Densetsushi: Zen”, (Japan): Bungei Shiryo Kenkyukai, 1926?
Keyes, Roger, “Ehon: The Artist and the Book in Japan”, University of Washington Press, September 14, 2006
Shamoon, Deborah, “The Yokai in the Database: Supernatural Creatures and Folklore in Manga and Anime”, Marvel & Tales, Vol. 27, No. 2, The Fairy Tale in Japan (2013), pp. 276–289, Wayne State University Press https://www.jstor.org/stable/10.13110/marvelstales.27.2.0276
Tsutomu Ema, “Nihon Yokai Henge Shi”, Kyoto: Chugai Shuppan, 1923
Yoda, Hiroko and Alt, Matt, “Japandemonium: Illustrated The Yokai Encyclopedias of Toriyama Sekien”, Dover Publications, 2021

Yōkai
Japanese books
1841 books
Bestiaries